Texas Lady is a 1955 color American Western film directed by Tim Whelan in his final film before his death in 1957, and distributed by RKO Radio Pictures. It stars Claudette Colbert, Barry Sullivan and Ray Collins. The film tells the story of a female publisher who encounters injustice and violence in a Texas town.

Plot
On a riverboat, in 1885, gambler Chris Mooney loses heavily to Prudence Webb, then borrows a further $30,000 which he also loses to her.

He offers her a partnership but Prudence declines, informing him that her father embezzled funds to gamble with Chris, then committed suicide after he lost. Prudence has therefore avenged her father's loss and has the money to pay back her late father's employer.

She rides to Fort Ralston in Texas to claim her inheritance, the Clarion newspaper, which her dad won in a card game. Stringer Winfield, the postal carrier, warns her that town founder Micah Ralston and ranch partner Sturdy own practically everything and everybody.

Clay Ballard, the editor of the Clarion, tries to get Prudence's ownership overturned, but drunken lawyer Cass Gower sobers up and wins her case, even though Judge Herzog is in Ralston's pocket. A hired gun, Jess Foley, acting as a "deputy," kills Gantz, a rival rancher. Foley then makes a play for Prudence, asking her to dance and to teach him to read. Prudence initially thinks he is lying about being illiterate but on finding this is true attends the evening dance at the Fandango. However, she resists his advances.

Chris shows up. Foley objects to his romantic interest in Prudence, and warns Chris to beware of Foley's jealousy and gun. Chris manages to hold off Foley, who also has Gantz's widow after him.

The crooked sheriff, Herndon (on orders from Ralston) gives Prudence 24-hour's notice within which to repay $6,000 due in back taxes from the newspaper, or forfeit her property. Prudence concedes defeat and intends to ride out of town with Chris, who gambled unsuccessfully and failed to raise the money. Chris sits on a chair outside the Clarion office and waits for Foley. As Foley draws his gun, Chris (still seated) shoots him in the hand.

Chris is put in jail but the judge is persuaded to grant habeas corpus and he is released. Meanwhile an old lady enters the sheriff's office and shoots Foley dead in vengeance for his killing of her son.

The sherrif nails a notice of sale on the newspaper office.

Her new friends in the town collect the $6,000 on her behalf, and order the arrest of the sheriff. They have an election for new city officials, electing Chris as the new mayor, Cass as the new judge and saloon owner Moore as the new sheriff. Ralston objects to the election results and uses his controlling power of the surrounding land to create a blockade. Ralston's men encircle the town and start shooting, with most of the defenders being older men. Stringer rides for the Texas Rangers, Cass having been killed. After reasoning with Ralston he gives in and returns the $6000 falsely claimed as tax. Law and order arrives in town.

Cast
Claudette Colbert as Prudence Webb
Barry Sullivan as Chris Mooney
Ray Collins as Mica Ralston (rancher)
James Bell as Cass Gower
Horace McMahon as Stringer Winfield
Gregory Walcott as Deputy Jess Foley
John Litel as Meade Moore (wigwam owner)
Douglas Fowley as Clay Ballard (Clarion owner)
Don Haggerty as Sheriff Herndon
Walter Sande as Whit Sturdy (rancher)
Alexander Campbell as Judge E. Ness Herzog
Florenz Ames as Wilson (general store owner)
Kathleen Mulqueen as Nancy (Nanny) Winfield
Robert Lynn as Reverend Callender
Paul Wexler as hotel clerk (uncredited)

References

External links

1955 films
1955 Western (genre) films
American Western (genre) films
Films about journalists
Films directed by Tim Whelan
Films set in Texas
Films scored by Paul Sawtell
1950s English-language films
1950s American films